Fanfare of Love (French: Fanfare d'amour) is a 1935 French comedy film directed by Richard Pottier and starring Fernand Gravey, Betty Stockfeld and Julien Carette. The film's art direction was by Max Heilbronner. The story was remade in West Germany in 1951 as Fanfares of Love and then in 1959 as the American film, Some Like It Hot.

Synopsis
Two unemployed male musicians disguise themselves as women so they can join an all-female orchestra heading for the French Riviera.

Cast
 Fernand Gravey as Jean 
 Betty Stockfeld as Gaby 
 Julien Carette as Pierre 
 Gaby Basset as Poupette 
 Jacques Louvigny as Alibert 
 Pierre Larquey as Emile 
 Madeleine Guitty as Lydia 
 Jane Lamy
 Ginette Leclerc 
 Palau
 Paul Lovetall
 Eugène Frouhins
 Anthony Gildès 
 Paul Marthès 
 Henri Vilbert 
 Roger Duchesne 
 Paul Demange 
 Josyane Lane

References

Bibliography 
 Terri Ginsberg & Andrea Mensch. A Companion to German Cinema. John Wiley & Sons, 2012.

External links 
 

1935 films
1935 comedy films
French comedy films
1930s French-language films
Films directed by Richard Pottier
French black-and-white films
1930s French films